George Bridges (c. 1762 – 13 March 1840) was Lord Mayor of London and a Member of Parliament.

He was the son of George Bridges of Gloucester and set up as a wine merchant in London, becoming a member of a London livery company in 1791. He was a Director of the Grand Junction Waterworks Company from 1814 to his death.

As a member of the Wheelwrights' Company he was elected an Alderman for the City of London in 1811. After two failed attempts he was appointed a Sheriff of London for 1816–17 and then served as Lord Mayor of London for 1819–20.

In 1820 he was elected to serve as the Member of Parliament (MP) for the City of London, sitting until the following general election in 1826.

He died in London in 1840. He had married Frances, the daughter of wine merchant Henry Delamain of Middlesex. He had two sons, one of whom predeceased him. He left an estate in Chigwell to his other son.

References

|-

1760s births
1840 deaths
English merchants
Aldermen of the City of London
Sheriffs of the City of London
19th-century lord mayors of London
19th-century English politicians
Members of the Parliament of the United Kingdom for English constituencies
UK MPs 1820–1826
Year of birth uncertain